I'll See You at Lake Constance is a 1956 West German comedy film directed by Hans Albin and starring Gretl Schörg, Lonny Kellner and Erwin Strahl. The film was shot in Agfacolor. It is set in a tourist hotel on the edge of Lake Constance, where its female owner's experiences have taught her not to trust men.

Cast
 Gretl Schörg as Marianne
 Lonny Kellner as Monika
 Erwin Strahl as Klaus
 Joachim Brennecke as Dr. Werner Bergmann
 Carola Höhn as Frl. Schramm, Sekretärin
 Beppo Brem as Schöberl, Portier
 Erna Sellmer as Erna, seine Frau
 Bum Krüger as Hotelarzt
 Ursula Barlen as Mrs. Mills
 Peter Garden as Ein schöner Mann
 Margot Rupp as Schwester Helene
 Käthe Haack as Frau Engelmann
 Willem Holsboer as Lehrer Martin
 Angelika Bender as Vera
 Ernst Freundorfer as Nicki

References

Bibliography 
 Parish, Robert. Film Actors Guide. Scarecrow Press, 1977.

External links 
 

1956 films
1956 comedy films
German comedy films
West German films
1950s German-language films
Films directed by Hans Albin
Films set in hotels
1950s German films